Alison Whyte (born 1968 in Tasmania) is an Australian actress best known for her roles on the Australian television series Frontline and Satisfaction.

Acting career
A former student of classical ballet, Whyte graduated from the Victorian College of the Arts before rising to prominence on Australian television for her role as the moralising producer Emma Ward on Frontline, the ABC's parody of current affairs programs – a role for which she won the 1997 Silver Logie Award for Most Outstanding Actress. From 2007 to 2010 she played Lauren, the housewife-turned-prostitute on Satisfaction. She won the 2008 Silver Logie Award for Most Outstanding Actress for this role.

Her other television roles have included the legal comedy-drama Marshall Law in 2002 with Lisa McCune and William McInnes, and Good Guys Bad Guys. She has also guest starred in an episode of City Homicide. Whyte's film roles include the two-actor film Saturday Night, with Aaron Pedersen, and The Dressmaker directed by Jocelyn Moorhouse. Whyte is also one of Australia's leading stage actors, with roles in A Midsummer Night's Dream, Twelfth Night and Much Ado About Nothing. In 2008, she appeared in a production of David Williamson's play Don's Party at the Sydney Opera House. 

In 2010, Whyte won Best Female Actor in Supporting Role in a Play at the 10th Annual Helpmann Awards for her portrayal of Queen Elizabeth in Richard III, directed by Simon Phillips. She was also nominated for Best Female Actor in a Play in 2014 for The Bloody Chamber, and in 2017 for Faith Healer.

Other work
From 1995 to 2007 Whyte and her husband Fred Whitlock ran the Terminus Hotel in Abbotsford, Melbourne. The couple then went on to own the Yarra Glen Grand Hotel, in the Yarra Valley, before selling it in 2015. 

Whyte has visited Vietnam and Cambodia as a spokesperson for Oxfam.

Awards

Filmography

Film

Television

References

External links
 
 Australian Television Information Archive
 Jill Stark, "Pub with guilt-free beer" in The Age, Sept 22, 2005
 Alison Whyte's character Lauren from Satisfaction

1968 births
Actresses from Melbourne
Actresses from Tasmania
Australian film actresses
Australian television actresses
Helpmann Award winners
Living people
Logie Award winners
Victorian College of the Arts alumni
20th-century Australian actresses
21st-century Australian actresses